Time to Be King is the fourth studio album by the multinational power metal band Masterplan. It is their third album with original singer Jørn Lande, the first since his original departure in 2006, and the last before his final departure in 2012. He left the band in 2006 for the first time, citing musical differences as the reason.

The album was originally planned to be released on 16 April 2010 but during a listening session in Hamburg it was confirmed that the release date was pushed back to 21 May. The album features a rawer and less complex sound than the previous albums but still with Masterplan's progressive and melodic power metal trademarks. Lead singer Jørn Lande had a major contribution to the songwriting, he wrote some of the music and all the lyrics for the songs. Also keyboardist Axel Mackenrott took part as one of the main songwriters and brought the ideas for songs like Time to Be King and Blue Europa. Roland Grapow said Axel is now "totally filling the shoes of Uli (Kusch) and he has a very familiar style of writing that I love so much and it’s very important for the band."

Jørn Lande has recorded a slightly different version of the title track on his 2012 solo album, Bring Heavy Rock to the Land.

The band had some problems touring during the time the album was released due to some of the band members' other commitments. This resulted in the departure of bass player Jan S. Eckert, drummer Mike Terrana and once again singer Jørn Lande from the band.

Track listing
All music written by Roland Grapow, Jørn Lande & Axel Mackenrott, except where noted. All lyrics by Jørn Lande.

Line-up 
 Jørn Lande - vocals
 Roland Grapow - guitar
 Jan S. Eckert - bass, backing vocals
 Mike Terrana - drums
 Axel Mackenrott - keyboards

Credits 
 Produced by Roland Grapow
 Recorded by Roland Grapow at Grapow Studios (SVK)
 Mixed & Mastered by Mikko Karmila, Roland Grapow & Mika Jussila at Finnvox Studio, Helsinki (FIN)
 Bandphotos by Sight of Sound
 Artwork & Design by Hiko
 Original crown designed by Jose Mesa “Mataparda”.

Single

Far from the End of the World
The single "Far from the End of the World", contains two different versions of the song (single and album version), It has also another song taken from the main album, the song is called "Lonely Winds of War".

References

2010 albums
Masterplan (band) albums
AFM Records albums